Miranda Phillips Cowley Heller (born in 1961 or 1962) is a writer, novelist, and TV developer. She spent a decade developing drama series at HBO, including The Wire and The Sopranos. She is known for her debut novel, The Paper Palace, which was published in 2021 to acclaim. The book was purchased by HBO and will be developed into a mini-series.

Personal life 
Cowley Heller grew up in New York in a literary and artistic family. Her grandfather, Malcolm Cowley, was a renowned poet and critic, her aunt Hayden Herrera is an art historian and biographer, and her sister Zoë Heller is an acclaimed writer. She is married to Bruno Heller, a British TV screenwriter. She currently splits time living in London, Los Angeles, and Cape Cod.

She is a graduate of Harvard University.

Career 
Cowley Heller has had a prolific career across books, magazines, and TV. She began her career at Cosmopolitan magazine where she worked as a fiction and books editor. She spent a decade as head of drama series at HBO in the early 2000s. As a writer, she has worked as a ghostwriter, a book doctor on other' books, and screenwriting editor. In 2021, she published her own debut novel, The Paper Palace.

TV 
In 1997, Cowley Heller moved to LA to begin her job at HBO. She spent nearly a decade working there as senior vice president and head of drama series. She began at HBO before a drama series department existed, and she led with a "writer-led" approach to TV development. While at HBO, she worked on hit shows such as The Sopranos, The Wire, Six Feet Under, Big Love, and Deadwood.

The Paper Palace 
In 2021, Cowley published her debut novel, The Paper Palace, after a nine-way auction across the US and UK. The novel was incredibly successful, quickly becoming a #1 New York Times' Bestseller, a Reese's Book Club pick, and longlisted for the 2022 Women's Prize for Fiction. Thirty international editions of the book have also been published.

The book rights were purchased by HBO, which has plans to develop it into a mini-series. Cowley Heller is developing the screenplay.

The process of writing the book was long and non-linear. Cowley Heller was accepted into a PhD program in art history at UCLA but turned it down to move with her husband for his job. When the PhD fell through, she turned back to writing a book that she had begun years before and stuck in a drawer. That book was The Paper Palace. The book takes place over the course of 24 hours in the backwoods of the Outer Cape of Cape Cod.

Published works 

 (2021) The Paper Palace. New York: Riverhead Books. ISBN 978-0-593-32982-5

References 

Harvard College alumni
Living people

1960s births
Year of birth uncertain